Conches is the plural form of conch, a type of mollusk.  It may also refer to:

Places in France 
 Conches-en-Ouche, a commune in the Eure département in northern France near Évreux
 Château de Conches-en-Ouche, a ruined castle in the commune of Conches-en-Ouche
 Conches-sur-Gondoire, a commune on the Gondoire river in Brie, in the Seine-et-Marne department in the Île-de-France region near Paris
 Conques, a former commune in the Aveyron department in southern France, in the Midi-Pyrénées region, location of the famous abbey, now part of Conques-en-Rouergue

People 
 Raoul IV de Conches born Ralph de Tosny (before 1080 – 1126), a Norman nobleman
 Isabel of Conches, wife of Ralph of Tosny
 William of Conches (c. 1090 – after 1154), French scholastic philosopher who sought to expand the bounds of Christian humanism by studying secular works of the classics and fostering empirical science
 Peter of Courtenay, Lord of Conches (c. 1218 – 1249 or 1250), French knight and a member of the Capetian House of Courtenay, a cadet line of the royal House of Capet
 Félix-Sébastien Feuillet de Conches (1798-1887), French diplomat, journalist, writer and collector

See also 
 Conch (disambiguation)
 Conchs